They Drive by Night is a 1938 British black-and-white crime thriller film directed by Arthur B. Woods and starring Emlyn Williams as Shorty, an ex-con, and Ernest Thesiger as Walter Hoover, an ex-schoolmaster. It was produced by Warner Bros. - First National Productions and based on the 1938 novel They Drive by Night by James Curtis.

The picture is sometimes confused with the 1940 American film They Drive by Night based on the novel The Long Haul by A. I. Bezzerides and featuring George Raft and Humphrey Bogart. This British film also has the alternative title, perhaps only in the United States, of Murder on the Run.

Plot

"Shorty" Matthews (Emlyn Williams) having recently been released from prison visits his girlfriend in London only to discover she has been murdered. Fearing he will be wrongly accused of being the culprit he disappears amongst the long-distance lorry driving community.
Meanwhile, the real killer, unassuming ex-schoolteacher Walter Hoover (Ernest Thesiger), continues to prey on London women. 
As Shorty had feared he has become the main suspect. He returns to London with old flame Molly to prove his innocence.

Cast
Emlyn Williams as Shorty Matthews
Ernest Thesiger as Walter Hoover
Anna Konstam as Molly O'Neill
Allan Jeayes as Wally Mason
Anthony Holles as Murray
Ronald Shiner as Charlie, the café proprietor
William Hartnell as Bus Conductor
 Leonard Sharp as Card Player at Billiard Hall
 Iris Vandeleur as Flower Seller

Production

James Curtis adapted his own novel, They Drive by Night to provide the screenplay for the film. The female victims of the book were prostitutes and to prevent censorship this aspect was watered down. Additionally, the book featured scenes of police brutality that were excised altogether.

The film was made by Warner Brothers at the recently purchased Teddington Studios as a quota film under the "Cinematograph Films Act 1927".

Release and reception

On release in the UK it was well received critically with author Graham Greene being a notable fan. Of the film he cited how close it came to French cinema with its realism and lack of romanticism. While it gained a certificate to be released in the US the studio cited  an inability to get a negative out of the UK. As such it did not receive a US theatrical release.

It is often confused with the American film noir starring George Raft and Ida Lupino, director Raoul Walsh's They Drive by Night, based on the novel The Long Haul by A. I. Bezzerides. Since both were Warner Brothers films it is possible the identical titles contributed to the British version's obscurity.

Leslie Halliwell's 1977 edition of The Filmgoer's Companion cites the picture as the director Arthur B. Woods' most notable film and also a film of note for Ernest Thesiger.

The film is currently unavailable on DVD. However, the novel was reissued by London Books with an introduction by Jonathan Meades in 2008.

References

External links
 
 
 
 
 
 
 They Drive by Night Film Programme at London Books

1938 films
British chase films
British crime thriller films
1930s English-language films
British black-and-white films
1930s chase films
Films based on British novels
Films set in London
Quota quickies
Warner Bros. films
Films directed by Arthur B. Woods
1930s crime thriller films
1930s British films